Ulrich Bittorf (born 2 September 1959) is a retired German football midfielder.

References

External links
 

1959 births
Living people
German footballers
Bundesliga players
2. Bundesliga players
Germany under-21 international footballers
VfL Bochum players
Bayer 04 Leverkusen players
1. FC Nürnberg players
Rot-Weiß Oberhausen players
SG Union Solingen players
1. FC Bocholt players
Association football midfielders